Mike Sgroi (born August 14, 1978) is a former Canadian professional ice hockey player. Sgroi last played for the Orlando Solar Bears of the ECHL, the 28th team of his professional career.

Career

Early career
In August 2005, Sgroi participated in the Battle of the Hockey Enforcers in Prince George, British Columbia, a one night made-for-TV event that featured enforcers from various minor leagues (largely Quebec's LNAH) fighting on-ice in full equipment, with Sgroi standing out as the only participant in the field that was currently on an AHL roster. In the group stage, Sgroi defeated NHL veteran Jason Simon and Jason Bone by TKO and unanimous decision respectively, before earning a forfeit win over John Hewitt due to injury. After winning the group, Sgroi defeated Steve Reid by TKO in the semifinals before losing to Dean Mayrand by split decision in the finals.

2007–08
During the 2007–08 ECHL season, Sgroi was traded from Pensacola for Michael Cohen. Later that year, Sgroi set a career high in goals with 25 total, which quickly become a fan favorite in Johnstown.

2008–09
On January 24, 2008, Sgroi was traded to the Utah Grizzlies for future considerations. However, it was short-lived, as Sgroi only played one game with the Grizzlies before he was traded to the Elmira Jackals. After he was traded twice in one week, this alerted clubs to his availability. There were two clubs however that were said to be very interested in Sgroi's services, these were Coventry Blaze and Sheffield Steelers, both of whom play in the top league in the United Kingdom. After a few weeks their interest was said to have died down.

2009–10
Sgroi started the season in training camp with the Rochester Americans of the AHL. On September 28, 2009, Sgroi was cut from Amerks camp. On November 2, 2009, Sgroi signed a one-year contract with the Laredo Bucks of the CHL and wore jersey #22. After a month with the team, Sgroi was waived by the Bucks on December 10, 2009.

On January 26, 2010, the Elite Ice Hockey League Club Sheffield Steelers announced that they have signed Sgroi to a contract. To make room for him, the Steelers released forward Brad Cruikshank. Despite putting up 18 points in 20 games and providing the role of enforcer for the Steelers, the Steelers announced on May 20, 2010 that Sgroi would not be returning to the team.

On October 22, 2010, the Colorado Eagles of the Central Hockey League signed Sgroi to a contract.

2011–12
On August 18, 2011, the Evansville IceMen of the Central Hockey League signed Sgroi to a contract.

2012–13
Sgroi signed a one-year contract with the CHL's Rapid City Rush on July 19, 2012. Sgroi was released by the Rush on October 21, 2012.  He was later signed by the Orlando Solar Bears of the ECHL. Sgroi has been on and off of the Solar Bears' roster, having been signed and released three separate times within his two months with the team, most recently been released on March 13, 2013.

Sgroi retired from professional hockey at the end of the 2016-17 ECHL season.

Personal
Sgroi is also a mixed martial arts fighter who teaches muay thai in the offseason. According to an Elmira Jackals press release, Sgroi started his mixed martial arts career 5–0.
Sgroi also enjoys playing poker in his offtime and has competed in tournaments. He once finished 27th out of 780 players in a World Series of Poker event
Sgroi appears in the 2010 EA Sports video game NHL Slapshot. He is not assigned to a team, but can be found on the game's free agent list.
Sgroi makes his home in Orlando, Florida.

References

External links

1978 births
Albany River Rats players
Binghamton Senators players
Bridgeport Sound Tigers players
Canadian ice hockey left wingers
Chicago Wolves players
Colorado Eagles players
Danville Wings (NAHL) players
Elmira Jackals (UHL) players
Elmira Jackals (ECHL) players
Evansville IceMen players
Greensboro Generals players
Idaho Steelheads (ECHL) players
Johnstown Chiefs players
Laredo Bucks players
Lexington Men O' War players
Living people
New Orleans Brass players
Norfolk Admirals players
Orlando Solar Bears (ECHL) players
Pensacola Ice Pilots players
Quad City Mallards (UHL) players
Rockford IceHogs (UHL) players
Ice hockey people from Toronto
Sheffield Steelers players
Syracuse Crunch players
Fort Worth Brahmas players
Toledo Storm players
UMass Lowell River Hawks men's ice hockey players
Utah Grizzlies (AHL) players
Wheeling Nailers players
Wilkes-Barre/Scranton Penguins players
Muay Thai trainers
Utah Grizzlies (ECHL) players
Canadian expatriate ice hockey players in England
Canadian expatriate ice hockey players in the United States